Woolston may refer to:

Places

United Kingdom
 Woolston, Cheshire, a village and civil parish in Warrington
 Woolston, Devon, on the list of United Kingdom locations: Woof-Wy near Kingsbridge, Devon
 Woolston, Southampton, a city suburb in Hampshire
 Some hamlets:
 Woolston, Cornwall, to the northwest of St Ive
 Woolston, north Shropshire, near Oswestry
 Woolston, south Shropshire, near Church Stretton and Craven Arms
 Woolston, Somerset, near the village of North Cadbury, between Wincanton and Yeovil
 Wolston, Warwickshire

New Zealand
 Woolston, New Zealand, a suburb of Christchurch

People
 Andrew Woolston, English curler in the 2010-2015 European Curling Championships
 Beulah Woolston (1828–1886), pioneering American missionary teacher in China
 Bob Woolston (born 1968), English cricketer
 Thomas Woolston (1668–1733), English theologian
 Thomas G. Woolston (fl. 1995), American patent attorney
 Florence Guy Woolston Seabury (1881–1951), suffragist, journalist in New York

Sports clubs
 Woolston Rovers, a rugby league team based in Warrington
 Woolston Technical, a semi-professional association football club based in Woolston, New Zealand
 Woolston W.M.C., an association football club based in Woolston, New Zealand
 Woolston Works F.C., a defunct late 19th century football club formerly based at Woolston, Hampshire

Other uses
 HMS Woolston (1918) (L49), a W Class destroyer of the Royal Navy
 Woolston Memorial Hospital, a Christian hospital established in 19th century Fuzhou
 Woolston railway station, serving Woolston, Southampton
 Woolston School, a secondary comprehensive school in Southampton, Hampshire, in southern England
 Woolston-Steen Theological Seminary, a college in Index, Washington, U.S., offering degrees in Wiccan Ministry.

See also
Woolaston, a village in the Forest of Dean, Gloucestershire, England
Woollaston (disambiguation), a disambiguation page